Trimeresurus vogeli, commonly known as the Vogel's pit viper, is a venomous pitviper species native to Southeast Asia.

Etymology
The specific name, vogeli, is in honor of German herpetologist species:Gernot Vogel.

Geographic range
T. vogeli is found in Cambodia, Laos, Thailand, and Vietnam.

Habitat

Description
T. vogeli is large for its genus, and exhibits definite sexual dimorphism. Females are longer, and may exceed  in SVL.

Reproduction
T. vogeli is viviparous.

References

Further reading
Chan-ard T, Parr JWK, Nabhitabhata J (2015). A Field Guide to the Reptiles of Thailand. New York: Oxford University Press. 352 pp.  (hardcover),  (paperback). (Viridovipera vogeli, p. 288).
David P, Vidal N, Pauwels OSG (2001). "A Morphological Study of Stejneger's Pitviper Trimeresurus stejnegeri (Serpentes, Viperidae, Crotalinae), with the Description of a New Species from Thailand". Russian Journal of Herpetology 8 (3): 205–222. (Trimeresurus vogeli, new species).
Malhotra A, Thorpe RA (2004). "A phylogeny of four mitochondrial gene regions suggests a revised taxonomy for Asian pitvipers (Trimeresurus and Ovophis)". Molecular Phylogenetics and Evolution 32: 83–100. (Viridovipera vogeli, new combination).

vogeli
Reptiles described in 2001